Terry Adams may refer to:
Terry Adams (baseball) (born 1973), former Major League Baseball pitcher
Terry Adams (BMX rider) (born 1983), professional flatland BMX rider
Terry Adams (musician) (born 1948), American pianist/composer
Terry Adams (rugby league) (fl. 1973–1979), Australian professional rugby league footballer
Terry Adams, British criminal connected to the Clerkenwell crime syndicate

See also
Adams (surname)
Terry v. Adams, 1953 United States Supreme Court decision